Gottschlich may refer to:

 Gudrun Gottschlich (born 1970), German footballer
 Hugo Gottschlich (1905–1984), Austrian actor
 Stefanie Gottschlich (born 1978), German footballer
 Markus Gottschlich, Austrian jazz pianist and composer
 Ronny Gottschlich (born 1975), German businessman